Celastrina gozora, the Mexican azure, is a butterfly of the family Lycaenidae. It is found in Mexico, Panama, and Honduras.

References

gozora
Butterflies of Central America
Butterflies of North America
Lycaenidae of South America
Butterflies described in 1870